Younès Kadri (born January 4, 1991) is an Algerian football player who plays for MC El Eulma in the Algerian Ligue Professionnelle 1.

Honours
 Won the 2010 Algerian Junior Cup with ES Sétif

References

External links
 
 

1991 births
Algeria youth international footballers
Algeria under-23 international footballers
Algerian footballers
Algerian Ligue Professionnelle 1 players
ES Sétif players
Living people
MC El Eulma players
Association football forwards
21st-century Algerian people